The bicoloured blind snake (Afrotyphlops nigrocandidus) is a species of snake in the Typhlopidae family. The common name "bicoloured blind skink" has also been coined for it, although it is not a skink. It is endemic to east–central Tanzania.

References

Afrotyphlops
Snakes of Africa
Reptiles of Tanzania
Endemic fauna of Tanzania
Reptiles described in 2000
Taxa named by Donald George Broadley